Grafton is the central village and a census-designated place (CDP) in the town of Grafton, Windham County, Vermont, United States. As of the 2020 census, it had a population of 49, compared to 645 in the entire town.

The CDP is in northern Windham County, southeast of the center of Grafton. It sits in the valley of the Saxtons River, where it is joined by its South Branch. The Saxtons is an east-flowing tributary of the Connecticut River.

Vermont Route 121 serves as Grafton's Main Street. It leads southeast  to Bellows Falls on the Connecticut River and northwest  to Londonderry. Vermont Route 35 (Chester Hill Road) runs north out of Grafton, leading  to Chester.

References 

Populated places in Windham County, Vermont
Census-designated places in Windham County, Vermont
Census-designated places in Vermont